Toyin Afolayan  (born 24 September 1959) popularly known as Lola Idije is a Nigerian film actress. She gained recognition after starring as Madam Adisa in a 1995 film titled Deadly Affair.

Toyin Afolayan is known as the initiator of popular internet slangs Soro Soke werey and Pele My Dear.  Soro Soke Werey is a term used by #EndSars protesters in Nigeria to demand that Government Speak Up and Louder on the excesses of the SARS Police unit in the country.

Biography 
Toyin Afolayan is an indigene of Agbamu, Kwara State in South West Nigeria. She is a cousin of Adeyemi Afolayan (aka Ade Love) and aunt to Nigerian film actors Kunle Afolayan, Gabriel Afolayan, Aremu Afolayan and Moji Afolayan. Toyin started acting in the '80s due to the influence of Ade Love. She has remained active in Nollywood till date, featuring more in Yoruba movies.

Personal life 
Toyin Afolayan is a widow, mother of three female children and grandmother. Her only son died at infancy.

Selected filmography 
Glimpse (2020)

Arojinle (2018)

Ojuloge Obirin (2017)

Irapada (2006)

Deadly Affair (1995)

Idunnu mi (2007)

Osunwon Eda (2006)

Olokiki oru: The midnight sensation (2019)

See also
 List of Nigerian actors

References

External links

1959 births
End SARS activists
Yoruba actresses
Actresses from Kwara State
Living people
Toyin
Actresses in Yoruba cinema
20th-century Nigerian actresses
21st-century Nigerian actresses
Nigerian film actresses